Jashnabad (also Romanized as Jashnābād; also known as Shahīdābād) is a village in Shahrestaneh Rural District, Now Khandan District, Dargaz County, Razavi Khorasan Province, Iran. At the 2006 census, its population was 922, in 229 families.

References 

Populated places in Dargaz County